Atypical adenomatous hyperplasia (AAH) is a hyperplastic lesion of the epithelial lining of pulmonary alveoli.

Tumorigenesis 

A multi-step carcinogenesis hypothesis suggests a progression from atypical adenomatous hyperplasia (AAH) through bronchioalveolar carcinoma (BAC) to invasive adenocarcinoma (AC), but to date this has not been formally demonstrated.

References 

Pulmonary lesion